The 2000–01 LEN Champions League was the 38th edition of LEN's premier competition for men's water polo clubs. It ran from  2000 to 19 May 2001, and it was contested by 8 teams. The Final Four (semifinals, final, and third place game) took place on May 18 and May 19 in Dubrovnik.

Preliminary round

Blue Group

Red Group

Final Four (Dubrovnik)
Bazen u Gružu, Dubrovnik, Croatia

Final standings

See also
2000–01 LEN Cup Winners' Cup
2000–01 LEN Cup

LEN Champions League seasons
Champions League
2000 in water polo
2001 in water polo